Puercosuchus is an extinct genus of azendohsaurid archosauromorph from the Blue Mesa Member of the Chinle Formation in Arizona. The genus contains a single species, Puercosuchus traverorum, known from a bonebed of at least eight individuals.

Discovery and naming

The Puercosuchus holotype, PEFO 43914, was discovered by a group of Girl Scouts in 2014, and since then, over 900 skeletal remains have been recovered from at least eight individuals. Many of these were previously referred to Malerisaurus. Puercosuchus was 
named and described in 2022 after being announced in 2021.

The generic name, "Puercosuchus", honours the Puerco River, near where the holotype was found. The specific name, "traverorum" honors the former Petrified Forest National Park superintendent, Brad Traver, and his wife, Denise Traver.

References

Allokotosaurs
Prehistoric reptile genera
Late Triassic reptiles of North America
Paleontology in Arizona
Fossil taxa described in 2022